The nanday parakeet (Aratinga nenday), also known as the black-hooded parakeet or nanday conure, is a medium-small, mostly green, Neotropical parrot native to continental South America.

Taxonomy
The nanday parakeet was previously regarded as a member of the monotypic genus Nandayus Bonaparte, 1854 one of the rough 16 genera of Neotropical parrots of tribe Arini which includes the conures and macaws. However, phylogenetic evidence showed that it is positioned in one of the four groups in the genus Aratinga. When the genus Aratinga was revised and split in four separate genera, this species was included in the current genus Aratinga. This revision was based on earlier studies. According to a mtDNA-based phylogenetic analysis of the genus Aratinga by Ribas & Miyaki (2004), the nanday conure forms a monophyletic group with the sun conure (A. solstitialis), jenday conure (A. jandaya), and golden-capped conure (A. auricapilla). Tavares et al. (2005) in a mitochondrial and nuclear DNA analysis of 29 species representing 25 of 30 genera of Neotropical parrots found the nanday conure's closest relative to be Aratinga solstitialis, the sun conure, and the time of divergence of the species to have been 0.5 to 1.3 Mya.

Hybrids of the nanday and sun conures, nanday and jenday conures, and nanday and blue-crowned conures are known.

A prehistoric relative, Aratinga vorohuensis, was described from Late Pliocene fossils found in Argentina.

Description
Its most distinguishing characteristic, for which it is named, is its black facial mask and beak. It also shows black, trailing flight feathers on its wings and has a long tail edged at the end in blue. The upper chest is bluish-green and the lower chest is a paler green. Feathers covering the thighs are red.

Distribution
The species is native to South America from southeast Bolivia to southwest Brazil, central Paraguay, and northern Argentina, from the region known as the Pantanal. Caged birds have been released in some areas, and the birds have established self-sustaining populations in Los Angeles, California, San Antonio, Texas, and several areas of Florida (including Pasco, Sarasota, Pinellas, Manatee, Broward, Palm Beach and Miami-Dade Counties).

Behavior

Food and feeding
The bird feeds on seeds, fruit, palm nuts, berries, flowers, and buds. Feral birds also come to bird feeders. Wild birds primarily use scrub forest and forest clearings around settlements. They frequent open savannah, pastures, and stockyards in South America, where they are considered as pests in some areas.

Breeding
Nanday parakeets usually find holes in trees to nest. Females lay three or four eggs. After raising their young, all birds form rather large communal roosts until the next breeding season.

Aviculture
The Nanday Parakeet is sometimes kept as a companion parrot. It is a loud, energetic bird that requires much mental and social stimulation as well as significant time outside of its cage in order to thrive. It may not be a suitable pet for small children due to its powerful beak. When kept in captivity, it may learn to talk and is also capable of learning tricks. The World Parrot Trust recommends that the Nanday Parkeet be kept in an aviary of 2–3 metres in length. The longest verified lifespan for this species is 18.7 years - however, there are also reports of Nanday Parakeets living for 30.2 years in captivity.

References

Bibliography 
 "National Geographic" Field Guide to the Birds of North America 
Handbook of the Birds of the World Vol 4, Josep del Hoyo editor, 
"National Audubon Society" The Sibley Guide to Birds, by David Allen Sibley,

External links

 Nanday conure
 "Nanday Conures or Black-hooded Parakeets"

nanday parakeet
Feral parrots
Birds of the Pantanal
nanday parakeet
nanday parakeet